This is a list of airlines currently operating in Mali:

See also
List of defunct airlines of Mali
List of airports in Mali

Mali
Airlines
Airlines
Mali